Southwest is an unincorporated community in Westmoreland County, Pennsylvania, United States near Pennsylvania Route 981. It has the ZIP code 15685.

References
 Southwest, Pennsylvania (15685)
 Southwest, PA 15685

Unincorporated communities in Westmoreland County, Pennsylvania
Unincorporated communities in Pennsylvania